Zërnovskë (formerly Zaroshkë;) is a village in the Pustec Municipality which is officially recognised as a Macedonian minority zone located in the Korçë County in Albania. It is located at the southeastern end of Lake Prespa, south of the village of Pustec. The village is composed of ethnic Macedonians, which form part of the larger Macedonian minority in Albania. According to Bulgarian sources, including research by a Bulgarian scientist from Albania, the local inhabitants are Bulgarians.

History
The "La Macédoine et sa Population Chrétienne" survey by Dimitar Mishev (D. Brankov) concluded that village had 120 Bulgarian Exarchists residents in 1905. In 1911, it was found to contain sixteen Bulgarian houses and 109 inhabitants.

In 1939, on behalf of 20 Bulgarian houses in Zarnovsko (Зърновско) Miag Sekula signed a request by the local Bulgarians to the Bulgarian tsaritsa Giovanna requesting her intervention for the protection of the Bulgarian people in Albania - at that time an Italian protectorate.

In 2013, the village's name, which had been changed to Zaroshkë during communist Albania, was reverted to Zrnovsko.

References

Populated places in Pustec Municipality
Villages in Korçë County
Macedonian communities in Albania